Huang Junqun is a former international table tennis player from China.

Table tennis career
She won five World Championship medals. During the 1981 World Table Tennis Championships she claimed a bronze medal in the women's doubles with Yan Guili and a gold medal in the mixed doubles with Xie Saike. 

Two years later at the 1983 World Table Tennis Championships she won a bronze in the singles, bronze in the mixed doubles with Xie Saike and a silver medal in the women's doubles with Geng Lijuan.

See also
 List of table tennis players
 List of World Table Tennis Championships medalists

References

HUANG Junqun (CHN). ITTF Database.

Chinese female table tennis players
Living people
Year of birth missing (living people)
Table tennis players from Wuhan